National Highway 722 (NH 722) is a  National Highway in India. This highway runs entirely in the state of Bihar.

References

National highways in India
National Highways in Bihar